Najm de Marrakech is a Moroccan football club currently playing in the GNFA 1. The club was founded in 1965 and is located in the town of Marrakech.

References

Football clubs in Morocco
Sport in Marrakesh
1965 establishments in Morocco